Mohawk Area School District is a rural, public school system in Bessemer, Lawrence County, Pennsylvania, United States. It is the largest school district in Lawrence County by area, serving the boroughs of Bessemer, New Beaver and SNPJ, as well as the townships of Mahoning (except for the southeastern part), Little Beaver, and North Beaver. According to 2010 federal census data, it serves a resident population of 10,850 people. In 2009, the district residents’ per capita income was $17,048, while the median family income was $42,756. In the Commonwealth, the median family income was $49,501 and the United States median family income was $49,445, in 2010.

Mohawk Area School District operates 2 schools, Mohawk Elementary School and Mohawk Junior Senior High School. The high school was built in 1963. In 1983, the elementary was constructed in an adjacent space of land to the high school. The district produces a newsletter/newspaper called "The Mohawk News" that is delivered to every addressee in the school district every season. The Lawrence County Career and Technical Center is an alternative facility for students in grades 10–12.

Extracurriculars
Mohawk Area School District offers a variety of clubs, activities and an extensive sports program.

Sports
The District funds:

Boys
Baseball - AA
Basketball- AA
WPIAL CHAMPIONS - 1970 PIAA RUNNERS-UP 1970
Cross Country - AA
Football - A
Golf - AA
Soccer - AA
Track and Field - AA
WPIAL CHAMPIONS - 1988, 1989, 1990, 1991, 1992, 1994

Girls
Basketball - AA
WPIAL CHAMPIONS- 2020, 2021
PIAA Runners-Up 2021
Cross Country - A
WPIAL CHAMPIONS - 2020
PIAA RUNNERS-UP - 2020, 2021
Soccer (Fall) - A
Softball - AA
Track and Field - AA
WPIAL CHAMPIONS - 2021
Volleyball

Junior High School Sports

Boys
Basketball
Football
Track and Field	

Girls
Basketball
Track and Field
Volleyball 

According to PIAA directory July 2012

References

External links
 Mohawk School History
Mohawk Edline
Mohawk Athletics
Mohawk Clubs and Activities

School districts in Lawrence County, Pennsylvania
1963 establishments in Pennsylvania
School districts established in 1963